Matty Wildie (born ) is a professional rugby league footballer who plays as a  and  for Featherstone Rovers in the RFL Championship.

He previously played for the Wakefield Trinity Wildcats in the Super League, and on loan from the Wildcats at the Batley Bulldogs and Doncaster in the Championship. Wildie has also played for the Dewsbury Rams, Featherstone Rovers and the Bradford Bulls in the Championship.

Background
Wildie was born in Wakefield, West Yorkshire, England. He was Educated at Outwood Grange Academy.

Career
He previously played for the Wakefield Trinity Wildcats and the Batley Bulldogs (on loan). He signed a two-year contract extension with Wakefield Trinity Wildcats on 26 May 2011. Wildie began a loan spell at the Batley club for an initial one month, to June 2012.

In August 2014, he signed with the Dewsbury Rams for the 2015 season.

Featherstone Rovers (re-join)
On 29 October 2021, it was reported that he had signed for Featherstone in the RFL Championship

References

External links

Featherstone Rovers profile
Search for "Matthew Wildie" AND "Rugby League" at BBC → Sport

1990 births
Living people
Batley Bulldogs players
Bradford Bulls players
Dewsbury Rams players
Doncaster R.L.F.C. players
Featherstone Rovers players
Leigh Leopards players
Rugby league five-eighths
Rugby league hookers
Rugby league players from Wakefield
Wakefield Trinity players